Firan may refer to:

Firan language, Nigeria
Carmen Firan, poet